Hopper is a surname. Notable people with the surname include:

People
Ailish Hopper, American poet
Alan Hopper (born 1937), English footballer
Andrew Hopper (1948–2018), British solicitor
Andy Hopper (born 1953), British computer scientist
Bill Hopper (disambiguation), several people
Briallen Hopper, American writer and scholar
Brian Hopper (born 1943), English musician
Christopher Hopper (1918–2009), British arts administrator
Clay Hopper (1902–1976), American basketball player
Deborah Hopper, American costume designer
Dennis Hopper (1936–2010), American actor
DeWolf Hopper (1858–1935), American actor, singer, comedian and producer
E. Mason Hopper (1885–1967), American film director
Edward Hopper (1882–1967), American painter and printmaker
Edna Wallace Hopper (1872–1959), American actress
Fran Hopper (1922–2017), American comic book artist
Grace Hopper (1906–1992), American computer scientist and naval officer
Hal Hopper (1912–1970), American musician, composer, and screenwriter
Harrison Hopper (born 2000), English footballer
Hedda Hopper (1885–1966), American actress and gossip columnist
Hugh Hopper (1945–2009), English guitarist and composer
Humphrey Hopper (1764/5–1844), English mason and sculptor
Isobel Hoppar (–after 1538), Scottish courtier
Isaac Hopper (1771–1852), American abolitionist and underground railroad pioneer
J. Hopper (Kent cricketer)
Jacob Hopper (born 1997), Australian rules footballer
Jade Hopper (born 1991), Australian tennis player
James Hopper (disambiguation), several people
Jerry Hopper (1907–1988), American film and television director
Jessica Hopper (born 1976), American writer
Jim Hopper (disambiguation), several people
John Hopper (politician) (1923–1996), American politician
John Hopper (scientist), Australian genetic epidemiologist
Josephine Hopper (1883–1968), American artist
Kev Hopper (born 1961), English musician
Lefty Hopper (1874-1959), American baseball player
Linda Hopper (born 1959), American musician
Luico Hopper (born 1952), American musician
Matt Hopper (born 1985), English rugby union footballer
Matthew Hopper (1893–1978), English footballer
Max Hopper (1934–2010), American IT manager
Niall Hopper (born 1935), Scottish footballer
Norris Hopper (born 1979), American baseball player
Paul Hopper, American linguist of British birth
Paul A. Hopper (born 1956), Australian bioentrepreneur
Randy Hopper (born 1966), American politician
Ray Hopper (born 1960), Australian politician
Regina Hopper, American journalist and attorney
Robin Hopper (1939–2017), Canadian ceramist
Ruthanna Hopper (born 1972), American author and actress
Ryan Hopper (born 1993), English footballer
Shirley Ximena Hopper Russell (1886–1985), American artist best known for Hawaiian themes
Stephen Hopper (born 1951), Australian botanist denoted by the author abbreviation "Hopper" when citing a botanical name
Suzanne Hopper (1970–2011), American police officer
Tim Hopper, American actor
Thomas Hopper (disambiguation), also Tom Hopper, several people
Tony Hopper (1976–2018), English footballer
Victoria Hopper (1909–2007), Canadian-born British actress
Wilbert Hopper (1933–2006), Canadian business executive
William Hopper (disambiguation), several people

Fictional characters
Franz Hopper, a character in Code Lyoko
Jim Hopper, a character in the Netflix television series Stranger Things